Gordon Hall (1784–1826) was an English missionary. Gordon Hall may also refer to:
 Gordon R. Hall (born 1927), a Utah Supreme Court Justice
 Gordon Langley Hall (probably 1922–2000), a prolific English author and biographer who wrote as Dawn Langley Simmons
 Gordon Hall (Dexter, Michigan), a historic house
 Gordon Hall, a British video game designer and co-founder of Rockstar Leeds (died 2021)

See also
Gordon Hall Caine (1884–1962), a British publisher and Conservative politician
Gordon Hall Gerould (1877–1953), a philologist and folklorist of the United States
Eric Gordon Hall (1922–1998), a Pakistan Air Force bomber and fighter pilot